Contributions to Mineralogy and Petrology is a peer-reviewed scientific journal published by Springer Science+Business Media since 1947. The journal is a hybrid open-access journal. The journal covers the fields of igneous and metamorphic petrology, geochemistry, and mineralogy.

Abstracting and indexing
This journal is indexed in the following databases:
Science Citation Index Expanded 
Current Contents - Physical, Chemical & Earth Sciences
Chemical Abstracts
VINITI
In 2018, the journal had an impact factor of 3.23.

References

English-language journals
Publications established in 1947
Springer Science+Business Media academic journals
Geology journals
1947 establishments in the United States